Heinrich Wilhelm Matthias Olbers was a German astronomer, physician and physicist
 Comet Olbers (disambiguation), several comets
 Olbers (crater), on the Moon
 Olbers, a 200 km diameter dark albedo feature on 4 Vesta's surface
 Olbers' paradox, evidence for a finite, dynamic universe, based on the luminosity of the night sky